Rudrapur is a town and a nagar panchayat in Deoria district in the Indian state of Uttar Pradesh.

Demographics
Per the 2011 census of India, Rudrapur had a population of 34,014. Males constitute 50% of the population and females 50%. The town has an average literacy rate of 67%, which is lower than the national average of 74%. Split amongst gender, male literacy is 73% and female literacy is 61%. In Rudrapur, 18% of the population is under 6 years of age. The political parties BJP, SP, BSP, INC are most popular in the area. The town has a temple named Dhudheswar Nath which is regularly visited by the people. There is also a fort here. The primary languages spoken are Bhojpuri and Hindi. There are many schools (from class L.K.G to 12) in both Hindi and English. There are graduate schools also. This town also has various types of markets (fresh vegetable markets, fresh fruit markets, clothing stores, general stores, medical stores/hospitals, various types of fast food and sweet shops), making it a common place for people from more distant villages to come for shopping and for medical facilities.

Notable people
 Jai Prakash Nishad (born 1960), member of Legislative Assembly of Deoria.
 Shiv Pratap Shukla (born 1952), former finance minister.
 Suresh Tiwari (born 1946), member of 15th and 17th Legislative Assembly of Deoria.
 Baleshwar Yadav (born 1942), member for Padrauna, 14th Lok Sabha.

References

Cities and towns in Deoria district